Hoseyn Khan ibn Mansur Beg Solvizi was initially the Lur hakem (governor) of parts of Lorestan from 1593, and then later beglerbeg (also governor) of the whole province. He also served as the mir of the Bakhtiaris. From 1603 and onwards, the Solvizi family became the hereditary governors of Lorestan. Hoseyn Khan was succeeded by his son Shahverdi Khan in 1631.

References

Sources 
 

16th-century births
17th-century deaths
16th-century people of Safavid Iran
17th-century people of Safavid Iran
Safavid governors of Lorestan